Filip Kukuličić (Cyrillic: Филип Кукуличић; born 13 February 1996) is a Montenegrin professional footballer who plays as a striker for German club FC Tempo in Frankfurt.

Club career
Kukuličić made his senior debut with Zeta in the 2012–13 Montenegrin First League. He spent six years at the club. In summer 2017 Kukuličić was transferred to Iskra. He spent just one years at the club, before moving to Serbia and joining to Zemun.

International career
He made one appearance for Montenegro at Montenegro U19.

Honours
Zeta
 Montenegrin First League: Runner-up 2016–17

References

External links
 
 

1996 births
Living people
Montenegrin footballers
Montenegrin expatriate footballers
Footballers from Podgorica
Association football forwards
Montenegro youth international footballers
FK Zeta players
FK Iskra Danilovgrad players
FK Zemun players
RFK Grafičar Beograd players
NK Aluminij players
FK Mačva Šabac players
Montenegrin First League players
Serbian SuperLiga players
Serbian First League players
Slovenian PrvaLiga players
Montenegrin expatriate sportspeople in Serbia
Montenegrin expatriate sportspeople in Germany
Expatriate footballers in Serbia
Expatriate footballers in Germany